The Association for Women in Architecture and Design (AWA+D) is a nonprofit professional association based in Los Angeles, California. The organization aims to support women working in the fields of architecture and design through educational programming, networking and mentoring. The history of the AWA+D dates back to 1922.

History 
In 1915 four female architect students from Washington University in St. Louis were rejected from the male architectural fraternity. These women, Helen Milius, May Steinmesch, Jane Pelton, and Angela Burdeau created their own architectural sorority called La Confrerie Alongine. La Confrerie Alongine later became Alpha Alpha Gamma. Those four women found many female architect students like themselves across numerous college campuses and started many chapters of Alpha Alpha Gamma. Founded on January 28, 1922, Alpha Alpha Gamma became an official national sorority supporting female students studying architecture. In 1934, practicing women architects formed the Association of Women in Architecture, with Alpha Alpha Gamma remaining the affiliate organization for students entering the workforce. In 1948 the organization elected to rename The Association for Women in Architecture to The Association for Women in Architecture and Allied Arts for the professional chapters to support women in similar fields facing similar challenges. This name change helped support women in fields of architecture, interior design, engineering, and artists of various principles. 

By 1950, there were around twenty professional and student chapters across the country. With the growth came pressure to maintain the association title. In doing so, meant publishing a newsletter called Keystone, as well as funding for a national annual convention. Because of the pressure, the organization precipitated to a re-organization, thus leading the organization to dissolve in 1964. Though both student and professional chapter still continued in universities and cities across the United States.

The Los Angeles chapter of Association for Women in Architecture (AWA-LA), soon became the sole survivor of AWA, with a large growth rate within the Los Angeles area. In 1975, the AWA-LA expanded membership to include others with interest in supporting women. This expand in membership included men. Thus the "of Women" portion of the name changed to "for Women" to represent the introduction of allowing men into the organization with the ideal to support women.

Today 
In 2012, the organization changed from The Association for Women in Architecture and Allied Arts to The Association for Women in Architecture and Design to support Architects, Contractors, Interior designers, Engineers, Urban Planners, Designers and Artists in similar fields, and students enrolled in these fields. Today Association for Women in Architecture and Design being a 501(c)(6) not for profit organization. With the Los Angeles chapter being the principle chapter, today the organization support women and the advances  that women in these fields experience. With the mission "We encourage and foster high levels of achievement by providing educational programming, mentoring, and illuminating career opportunities for students and professionals in these fields. We cultivate awareness of the value and advancements created by our profession." The organization continues to grow and change as more opportunities become available.

The organization's archives are held at the University Libraries at Virginia Tech in The International Archive of Women in Architecture (IAWA).

Chapters
Chapter of Alpha Alpha Gamma included:

 1922 - Alpha - Washington University in St. Louis
 1922 - Beta - University of Minnesota
 1922 - Gamma - University of Texas
 1922 - Delta - University of California
 1925 - Epsilon - University of Illinois
 1928 - Zeta - University of Michigan
 1935 - Eta - Cornell University
 1950 - Theta - Kansas State University
 1956 - Iota - Auburn University
 1957 - Kappa - University of California, Los Angeles
 1966 - Lambda - University of Kansas

Notable Members 
Norma Sklarek, a notable "first", was the first African- American women to receive a New York architectural license. As well as being the first women to be elected as a Fellow in the American Institute of Architects (FAIA). Later joining the Margot Siegel AIA Architecture firm. Which was established by another member, Margot Siegel in 1971. With another AWA-LA member, Kate Diamond, joining the firm. The joining of these three AWA-LA members within Margot Siegel AIA Architecture firm, created the largest women operated and owned firm.

Notable members:

 Georgia Louise Harris Brown

 Norma Sklarek
 Katherine Diamond
 Margot Siegel
 Henrietta May Steinmesch (co-founder)

External links

References 

1922 establishments in California
Organizations based in Los Angeles
Organizations established in 1922
Professional associations for women
Women's organizations based in the United States